The Kawasaki ZXR400 is a sport bike introduced by Kawasaki in 1989. It was one of the first and most popular of the  sport bikes that swept across Japan and later Europe in the 1990s. It was discontinued in 1999 in worldwide markets but remain until 2003 in United Kingdom.
 The H model was produced first, and was superseded by the L series in 1991. The L series had increased power output, but less torque, and updated slimmer rear styling. An earlier model called the ZX-4 was released as a Japan only model from 1987-1988.

Standard Models
1989 H1 Introduction model
1990 H2 Changes to swingarm, curved radiator replaced flat one, rest of bike unchanged
1991 L1 New Frame and Engine Changes. Fairing changes included single headlight unit
1992 L2 
1993 L3 
1994 L4 Limited edition ITOHAM Scheme
1995 - 1999 L5 
1999 L9 Modified engine internals and suspension

Homologation Models
Both the L and H models were produced in a very limited "Sport Production" series, allowing Kawasaki to homologate a higher specification to make them more competitive in the Formula 3 race series, and were only available in Japan.

The H1 Sport Production model was known as ZX400J1, and the H2 equivalent was ZX400J2.The L model dropped the "Sport Production" decals and instead had "400R" on the number board, and was simply known as ZX400M.These models are identified through the VIN, which begins with the digit 3. 

The J and M  specification included these additions over and above the standard models : Close ratio gearbox, FCR Flatslide carburettors with TPS, adjustable camshafts, lighter rear subframe combined with single seat unit, front suspension with compression & rebound damping, fully adjustable rear suspension, Mitsubishi CDI with a raised rev limit of 15200rpm.

See also
Honda CBR400
Honda RVF400
Yamaha FZR400
Suzuki GSX-R400

References

ZXR400
Sport bikes
Motorcycles introduced in 1988